The Role of Culture in Early Expansions of Humans  (ROCEEH) is an interdisciplinary project of the Heidelberg Academy of Sciences and Humanities. Within the framework of this Research Center, social scientists and natural scientists study the effect that culture had on the successive expansions of humans out of Africa and across the Old World. The Research Center is located at the University of Tübingen and the Senckenberg Research Institute in Frankfurt am Main, Germany.

The project was initiated in 2008 by the Heidelberg Academy of Sciences and Humanities and is scheduled to continue for 20 years until 2027.

Research

Background
Over the course of the last 2 million years at least two species of the genus Homo (Homo erectus and Homo sapiens) have expanded out of Africa in successive waves into Asia and Europe. Modern humans (Homo sapiens) were probably the only species of hominins capable of settling new territories such as Australia, the sub-arctic region and the Americas. While Australopithecines and early species of humans were limited by their natural environments—as most species are—our ancestors were able to take advantage of their newly developed cultural capacities on their way to becoming human, as well as adapting to their environment.

These thoughts helped to establish one of the working hypotheses in the ROCEEH project: The influence of the environment on the expansions of hominin species decreased through time, while the significance of culture increased through new technologies.

Goals of the ROCEEH project are:
 Reconstructing the expansion waves of diverse hominin species, as well as to understand their timing and direction. 
 Investigating their effects on the history of humanity. 
 Studying the expansion of the ecological surroundings of these hominins, as well as the expansions of cultural capacities between 3 million and 20,000 years ago. 
 Describing and analyzing the causes of these expansions. 
The project pays special attention to the development of human capabilities that deal with problem-solving through culture.

To achieve these aims, the project selected six senior researchers with experience in the disciplines of paleoanthropology, paleoecology, paleobotany, geography and archaeology.

Methods
A central part of the project is represented by the interdisciplinary and web-based database called the ROCEEH Out-of-Africa Database (ROAD) with geographic information system functions. Geographic data about a locality is added to information about the geological layers, the divisions of archaeological layers, and cultural remains. To complete the picture, information about important human and animal fossils, vegetation and climate is gathered in order to reconstruct early habitats. Using a geographic information system, the results are compiled in a digital atlas to show the important developments in human-environment interactions.

Organization
The ROCEEH is located at the University of Tübingen and the Senckenberg Research Institute in Frankfurt am Main, Germany. The leaders of the Research Center in Tübingen include Nicholas Conard and Volker Hochschild, as well as Volker Mosbrugger and Friedemann Schrenk in Frankfurt am Main. The current chairman of the Scientific Advisory Board is Hermann H. Hahn.

On occasions, the ROCEEH organizes international workshops, symposia and conferences, inviting guests to propose new methods and introduce and discuss the latest developments and research results.

References

External links
ROCEEH website

2008 establishments in Germany
Projects established in 2008
Research projects
Archaeological databases
University of Tübingen